Herbert Zangs (27 March 1924 – 26 March 2003) was a German artist.

Zangs was born and died in Krefeld. He studied at the Kunstakademie Düsseldorf together with Günter Grass. In 1960 he won the Vincent van Volkmer Prize.

There are several books about Zangs in the German national Library (dnb).

References

External links
 http://www.kettererkunst.com/bio/HerbertZangs-1924-2003.shtml

20th-century German painters
20th-century German male artists
German male painters
Kunstakademie Düsseldorf alumni
1924 births
2003 deaths
People from Krefeld